Tiyula itum (Tausug: "black soup") is a Filipino braised beef or goat soup or stew dish originating from the Tausug people. The dish is characteristically black due to the unique use of charred coconut meat.

Etymology
The name of the dish refers to the black, gray, or greenish color of the broth which is the result of the use of charred coconut meat. It is related to the tinola and nilaga dishes of other Filipino ethnic groups. It is also known as tiyula Sūg ("Sulu soup") or tinolang itim (the Tagalog literal translation of tiyula itum).

Description
Tiyula itum is prepared by rubbing and marinating chunks of beef in a pounded mixture of spices (pamapa) and powdered burnt coconut meat. It is then fried with garlic, onions, turmeric, ginger, and lengkuas. Once the meat is lightly browned, water is added along with additional ingredients like black pepper, lemongrass, and shallots and allowed to simmer until cooked. Coconut milk is sometimes added to thicken the broth. Other ingredients like tomatoes and siling haba chilis are also sometimes added, but they are not traditional. Tiyula itum is traditionally served with white rice or tamu rice cakes.

Cultural importance
Tiyula itum is culturally important among the Tausug people and is sometimes characterized as "Food for the Royalty". It is commonly prepared in special occasions like weddings and during Hari Raya festivities.

See also 
 Piyanggang manok
Kulawo
 Bulalo
 Kaldereta
 Pastil

References

Philippine soups